Massachusetts House of Representatives' 10th Norfolk district in the United States is one of 160 legislative districts included in the lower house of the Massachusetts General Court. It covers part of Norfolk County. Democrat Jeff Roy of Franklin has represented the district since 2013.

Towns represented
The district includes the following localities:
 Franklin
 part of Medway

The current district geographic boundary overlaps with those of the Massachusetts Senate's 2nd Middlesex and Norfolk district and Norfolk, Bristol and Middlesex district.

Former locales
The district previously covered:
 Canton, circa 1927 
 Sharon, circa 1927 
 Stoughton, circa 1872, 1927

Representatives
 Cyrus S. Mann, circa 1858 
 William H. Tucker, circa 1859 
 George R. Ellis, circa 1920 
 Richard James Allen, circa 1951 
 Everett Murray Bowker, circa 1951 
 Hibbard Richter, circa 1951 
 Joseph J. Semensi, circa 1975 
 James Vallee
 Jeffrey N. Roy, 2013-current

See also
 List of Massachusetts House of Representatives elections
 Other Norfolk County districts of the Massachusetts House of Representatives: 1st, 2nd, 3rd, 4th, 5th, 6th, 7th, 8th, 9th, 11th, 12th, 13th, 14th, 15th
 List of Massachusetts General Courts
 List of former districts of the Massachusetts House of Representatives

Images
Portraits of legislators

References

External links
 Ballotpedia
  (State House district information based on U.S. Census Bureau's American Community Survey).

House
Government of Norfolk County, Massachusetts